Al-Sunan al-Wusta,, or Marifat al-Sunan wa-al-Athar  is a hadith book compiled by Imam Al-Bayhaqi (384 AH – 458 AH). It is twenty volumes which provides a compilation of textual evidences of the Shafi'i jurisprudence.

Description
This book is considered to be one of the most important Shafi’i books, as it collected the hadith evidence of the school of thought, a way out for it from the Sahih and Sunnah, showing its methods, the reason for what was faltered from it, and the reason for Al-Shafi’i inferring it if it was faltered. Al-Bayhaqi also explained the doctrines of the followers and those after them, such as Abu Thawr, Al-Hasan al-Basri and Ahmad Ibn Hanbal, and he arranged it according to the arrangement of Al-Muzani. The old sayings of Al-Shafi’i are sometimes cited, and the book has some comments from the transcription of a hadith, the translation of a scholar, and attribution to a reference such as the mother.

Reception
Ibn al-Subki said: "No Shafi'i jurist can do without it," while his father, Taqi al-Din al-Subki said: "He meant by the title: Al-Shafi'i's Knowledge of the Sunnas and Reports."

See also
 List of Sunni books
 Sunan al-Kubra
 Shu'ab al-Iman
 Nihayat al-Matlab fi Dirayat al-Madhhab

References

9th-century Arabic books
10th-century Arabic books
Sunni literature
Hadith
Hadith collections
Sunni hadith collections